Nemaura Medical is a UK based Medical Technology company developing a wireless non-invasive blood glucose monitoring system called SugarBEAT.

Overview 
The company was founded by Dr Faz Chowdhury in 2013. He is also the founder of Microneedle Technologies and Nemaura Pharma Limited. It is headquartered in Loughborough, United Kingdom. It developed SugarBEAT, a disposable skin-patch that's sticks to the body using a non-irritant soft silicone gel. The skin-patch connects to a rechargeable transmitter which detects blood sugar and transfers the data to a mobile app at a 5-minute interval. The lifespan of the transmitter is 2 years and the skin patch can be used for 24 hours. The skin patch has an approximate thickness of 1mm. Electronic currents are used to draw interstitial fluid to the surface which analyses the glucose level.

Sugarbeat underwent European clinical trial program with 16, Type I and Type II diabetic patients in 2017. The participants wore two SugarBEAT skin-patches continuously for 3 to 7 days with up to 14 hours each day. The study yielded positive results. The first model of SugarBEAT is wired to a smartwatch and received CE approval in February, 2016.

Nemaura signed a marketing rights agreement with Dallas Burston Pharma (Jersey) Ltd to market SugarBEAT in UK and Ireland.

Nemaura is listed on NASDAQ since January 2018 as NMRD.

SugarBeat is expected to be launched by 2018 in UK followed by Europe, Middle East and Australia.

References

External links 
 Official website

Companies listed on the Nasdaq
Medical technology companies of the United Kingdom
Companies based in Loughborough